José Antonio Devecchi (born 9 July 1995) is an Argentine professional footballer who plays as a goalkeeper for Aldosivi on loan from San Lorenzo.

Honours
San Lorenzo
 Copa Libertadores: 2014

Argentina U-20
 South American Youth Football Championship: 2015

References

External links
 José Devecchi at Football-Lineups
 
 

1995 births
Living people
Argentine people of Italian descent
Argentine footballers
Argentine expatriate footballers
Argentina under-20 international footballers
Association football goalkeepers
San Lorenzo de Almagro footballers
Audax Italiano footballers
Aldosivi footballers
Argentine Primera División players
Chilean Primera División players
Argentine expatriate sportspeople in Chile
Expatriate footballers in Chile
Sportspeople from Corrientes Province